Al-Tall, was a Palestinian village 14 km northeast of Acre in the British Mandate District of Acre. Depopulated as a result of military assault and capture during the 1947-1948 Civil War in Mandatory Palestine as part of Operation Operation Ben-Ami by the Carmeli Brigade of the Israel Defense Forces.

History
The twin villages of Al-Tall and nearby Al-Nahr were both sites of ancient settlements atop the tel of Kabri. Recent excavations indicate habitation back to the eighteenth century BC.

Ottoman era
In the  Ottoman period, a mill was shown here on   Pierre Jacotin´s map from 1799.
In 1875, the French explorer Victor Guérin visited the village, which he called Et-Tell. He described it: "Below the village extend fresh and verdant gardens where the water flows and murmurs  incessantly in little canals, and where lofty poplars and great nut-trees, which recall Europe, mingle with the trees of Palestine. Near here is a mill, worked by water falling from a higher basin, which acts as a reservoir for a spring as abundant as that of Ras el 'Ain. After leaving the mill, the water forms a stream which fertilises the adjacent orchards. This raised and broad reservoir, whence the water escapes by an opening made for the purpose in the edge of the reservoir, is of modern construction, as is shown by the stones; but its first building must be ancient, because it is difficult to believe that the ancients should have neglected to get all the advantage possible from so important a spring."

In 1881  the PEF's Survey of Western Palestine described the village as "A stone and adobe village, containing about 200
Moslems, with figs,  olive, pomegranate, and mulberry trees  and gardens;  there are two streams of water at this village." The layout of the village was rectangular. Its houses were built from stone and concrete or from mud.

A population list from about 1887 showed that  Nahret Tell had about 275 inhabitants, all Muslim.

British era
In  1944/1945, the population of Al-Tall was 300.

Israeli rule
Al-Tall was captured by the Carmeli Brigade during Operation Ben-Ami. Following the war the area was incorporated into the State of Israel, but the village's land has not been incorporated into any municipality or village.

According to the Palestinian historian Walid Khalidi, the remaining structures on the village land were in 1992:
"The site is covered with the rubble of stone houses and is overgrown with wild grass. One stone house still stands but its facade is missing and it is about to crumble.  Cactuses and fig trees grow on the southern slopes of the site. There are four identifiable Roman and Byzantine tombs in the cemetery that lies on the northern slopes, a Christ-thorn tree stands in its midst. Recent excavations has uncovered several ancient graves, and the place has been turned into an archaeological site."

In 1993, when A. Petersen visited the place, the only structure he found standing was a cistern, known as Birket al-Mafshukh, located north of the tell. In 1881, it had been described as a "birket of masonry, and a large perennial spring, with a stream flowing from it to the sea; the stream is called the Nahr Mefshukh; gives a very plentiful supply of water." According to Petersen, the birkat was  "rectangular with a semi-circular extension at the west end."

See also
Depopulated Palestinian locations in Israel

References

Bibliography

External links
Welcome to al-Tall
al-Tall,  Zochrot 
Survey of Western Palestine, Map 3:  IAA, Wikimedia commons 
Al-Tal, pictures, Dr. Moslih Kanaaneh
Al-Tall from the Khalil Sakakini Cultural Center

District of Acre
Arab villages depopulated during the 1948 Arab–Israeli War
1948 disestablishments in Israel